Elfed Ellison Evans (28 August 1926 – 13 May 1988) was a Welsh professional footballer.

Career

Evans, an inside-forward, joined Cardiff City in May 1949 from Treharris, having previously played for Trelewis and Glamorgan side Nelson. He made his league debut the following season in a 1–1 draw with Sheffield Wednesday and, even though he played in less than half of the club's matches that season, he finished as the team's top scorer. He joined Torquay United on loan in March 1951, scoring 6 goals in 12 league games. He returned to Cardiff, playing one more season to finish his Ninian Park career with 18 goals in 46 games.

In June 1952 he moved to West Bromwich Albion for a fee of £5,000 and played 17 times the following season. However, he didn't appear in Albion's league side for the next two seasons and in June 1955 joined Wrexham for £1,250. In December 1956 he moved on again, after scoring 16 times in 34 league games for the Robins, joining Southport for £600. He played 13 games for Southport without scoring to finish his league career. He subsequently played for non-league sides Caernarfon Town and Burton Albion.

Elfed Evans died in May 1988 aged 61.

References

1926 births
1988 deaths
Welsh footballers
Cardiff City F.C. players
Torquay United F.C. players
West Bromwich Albion F.C. players
Wrexham A.F.C. players
Southport F.C. players
Burton Albion F.C. players
English Football League players
Association football forwards